Julio Enrique Pancorbo Ortiz (died February 17, 2023), better known as Henry LaFont, was a Puerto Rican lawyer, businessman, television comedian and tourism official. 

Pancorbo Ortiz was best known for his participation in a canal 4 television show named "Showtime" as part of a comedic duo named "Henry LaFont y El Casanova" ("Henry LaFont and the Casanova"). "Showtime" was televised for many years on canal 4.

Pancorbo Ortiz was also a lawyer, practicing in Lajas, Puerto Rico.

Pancorbo Ortiz was also the creator of Parador La Parguera, a tourist attraction in his hometown of Lajas, Puerto Rico. He co-founded the Empresas de Turismo Interno de Puerto Rico, a company that aimed at increasing domestic tourism among Puerto Rico residents.

See also 
List of Puerto Ricans

References 

Year of birth missing
20th-century births
2023 deaths
Puerto Rican comedians
20th-century Puerto Rican actors
20th-century Puerto Rican lawyers
People from Lajas, Puerto Rico
Place of birth missing
Place of death missing